Below is a list of Edison patents. Thomas Edison was an inventor who accumulated 512 patents worldwide for his inventions. 1,093 of Edison's patents were in the United States, but other patents were approved in countries around the globe.

Introduction
Edison is credited for contributing to various inventions, including  the phonograph, the kinetoscope, the dictaphone, the electric lamp (in particular the incandescent light bulb), and the autographic printer. He also greatly improved the telephone by inventing the carbon microphone. Most of these inventions were not completely original but improvements of earlier inventions. However, one of Edison's major innovations was the first industrial research and development lab, which was built in Menlo Park and West Orange.

Throughout the 20th century, Edison was the world's most prolific inventor. At the beginning of the century, he held 736 U.S. patents. His final count was 1,093 U.S. patents, including 1084 utility patents (patents for inventions) and 9 artistic design patents. It was not until June 17, 2003 that he was passed by Japanese inventor Shunpei Yamazaki. Yamazaki was subsequently passed by Australian inventor Kia Silverbrook on February 26, 2008.

American patents

First hundred patents

The first hundred patents mainly deal with the telegraph system. John Kruesi was the shop manager beginning in 1872. Kruesi built models, instruments, and apparatus for Edison's work.
John Ott worked with Edison throughout his career. Ott was Edison's main model and instrument maker. Charles Batchelor was a superintendent for Edison toward the end of this series of patents.

 patent number – name of patent (external links to patent images in TIFF format)

  – Electrographic Vote-Recorder : Edison's first patent. Permitted a "yes" or "no" vote via one of two switches. Washington congressmen were not interested in the device and the invention was unsuccessful. (1869)
  – Printing-Telegraphs
  – Printing-Telegraph Apparatus
  – Automatic Electrical for Telegraph Apparatus
  – Printing-Telegraph Apparatus
  – Electro-Motor Escapements
  – Printing-Telegraph Instruments
  – Governors for Electro-Motors
  – Printing-Telegraph Apparatus
  – Printing-Telegraph Apparatus
  – Telegraphic Transmitting Instruments
  – Relay Magnets
  – Electro-Magnets for Telegraph Instruments
  – Machinery for Perforating Paper for Telegraph Purposes
  – Telegraph Apparatus (1872)
  – Printing-Telegraphs
  – Telegraph Apparatus
  – Telegraphic Recording Instruments
  – Type-Wheels for Printing-Telegraphs
  – Type-Wheels for Printing-Telegraphs
  – Printing-Telegraphs
  – Printing-Telegraphs
  – Printing-Telegraphs
  – Printing-Telegraphs
  – Printing-Telegraphs
  – Printing-Telegraphs
  – Printing-Telegraphs
  – Printing-Telegraphs
  – Printing-Telegraphs
  – Printing-Telegraphs
  – Printing-Telegraphs
  – Printing-Telegraph Instruments
  – Electro-Magnets
  – Rheotomes or Circuit-Directors
  – Printing-Telegraphs
  – Printing-Telegraphs
  – Printing-Telegraphs
  – Printing-Telegraphs
  – Printing-Telegraphs
  – Printing-Telegraphs
  – Printing-Telegraph Instruments
  – Printing-Telegraph Instruments
  – Transmitters and Circuits for Printing-Telegraphs
  – Unison-Stops for Printing-Telegraphs
  – Paper for Chemical Telegraphs etc.
  – Apparatus for Perforating Paper for Telegraphic Use
  – Electrical Printing-Machines
  – Type-Writing Machines
  – Printing-Telegraph Instruments (1873)
  – Automatic Telegraph Instruments
  – Electro-Magnetic Adjusters 
  – Circuits for Chemical Telegraphs
  – Printing-Telegraphs
  – Printing-Telegraphs
  – Printing-Telegraphs
  – Printing-Telegraphs
  – Printing-Telegraphs
  – Printing-Telegraphs
  – Circuits for Printing-Telegraphs
  – Circuits for Automatic or Chemical Telegraphs
  – Circuits for Automatic Telegraphs
  – Chemical Telegraphs
  – Perforators for Automatic Telegraphs
  – Circuits for Automatic Telegraphs
  – Relay-Magnets
  – Electrical Regulators for Transmitting-Instruments
  – Galvanic Batteries
  – Telegraph-Signal Boxes
  – Electric Telegraphs
  – Perforators for Automatic Telegraphy
  – Chemical Telegraphs
  – Circuits for Chemical Telegraphs
  – Duplex Telegraphs
  – Telegraph-Relays
  – Receiving Instruments for Chemical Telegraphs
  – Chemical or Automatic Telegraphs
  – Automatic Telegraphy and Perforators Therefor
  – District Telegraph Signal-Boxes
  – Duplex Chemical Telegraphs
  – Telegraph Apparatus
  – Solutions for Chemical Telegraph-Paper
  – Solutions for Chemical Telegraph-Paper
  – Solutions for Chemical Telegraph-Paper
  – Adjustable Electro-Magnets for Relays, etc.
  – Solutions for Chemical Telegraph-Paper
  – Duplex Telegraphs
  – Chemical Telegraphy
  – Chemical Telegraphy
  – Chemical Telegraphy
  – Printing-Telegraphs
  – Transmitters and Receivers for Automatic Telegraphs
  – Automatic Telegraphs
  – Duplex Telegraphs
  – Solutions for Chemical Telegraphs
  – Solutions for Chemical Telegraphs
  – Recording-Points for Chemical Telegraphs
  – Electric-Signalling Instruments
  – Telegraph Apparatus
  – Automatic Roman-Character Telegraphs
  – Automatic Telegraphy

Second hundred (101 to 200)
In the second hundred patents, Edison continues his work with the telegraph. He also starts to patent electrical distribution and the light. 

  – Duplex Telegraphs (1876)
  – Duplex Telegraphs
  – Duplex Telegraphs
  – Autographic Printing
  – Duplex Telegraphs
  – Acoustic Telegraph
  – Electro-Harmonic Multiplex Telegraphs
  – Acoustic Electric Telegraphs
  – Telegraphic Alarm and Signal Apparatus
  – Automatic Telegraphs
  – Automatic Telegraphs
  – Stencil-Pens
  – Telephonic Telegraphs
  – Telephonic Telegraphs
  – Telephonic or Electro-Harmonic Telegraphs
  – Synchronous Movements for Electric Telegraphs
  – Phonograph or Speaking Machines : The first phonograph, a device for recording and replaying sound. Edison demonstrated the device for the first time on November 29, 1878.  The device recorded on a phonograph cylinder using up-down (vertical) motion of the stylus. Edison's patent specified that the audio recording was embossed.
  – Acoustic Telegraphs
  – Automatic-Telegraph Perforator and Transmitter
  – Speaking-Machines
  – Speaking-Telegraphs
  – Speaking-Telegraphs
  – Speaking-Telegraphs
  – Speaking-Telephones
  – Telephone Call-Signal
  – Telephones or Speaking-Telegraphs
  – Circuits for Acoustic or Telephonic Telegraphs
  – Perforating Pens
  – Pneumatic Stencil-Pens
  – Duplex Telegraphs
  – Duplex Telegraphs
  – Speaking-Telephones
  – Quadruplex-Telegraph Repeaters
  – Vocal Engines (better known as the Phonomotor)
  – Automatic Telegraphs
  – Electric Lights
  – Thermal Regulators for Electric Lights
  – Sextuplex Telegraphs
  – Duplex Telegraphs
  – Magneto-Electric Machines
  – Apparatus for Electric Lights
  – Electric Lighting Apparatus
  – Dynamo-Electric Machine
  – Electric Lights
  – Telephones
  – Carbon-Telephones
  – Magneto-Electric Machines :  Edison main dynamo.  The device's nickname was the "long-legged Mary-Ann". This device has large bipolar magnets and is highly inefficient.
  – Electric Lamp : Edison's incandescent light bulb invention. The original spiral carbon-filament is shown and repeatedly referred to.  First practical commercially viable electric lamp. This device replaced the flame lamp, gas lamp, kerosene-oil lamp, and wax candle.
  – Electric-Lighting Apparatus
  – Autographic Stencils for Printing
  – Safety-Conductor for Electric Lights
  – Electric Light
  – Electric Light
  – Electric Light
  – Phonograph
  – Magnetic Ore-Separator
  – Brake for Electro-Magnetic Motors
  – Method of Manufacturing Electric Lamps
  – Addressing-Machine
  – Electro-Chemical Receiving-Telephone
  – Acoustic Telegraph
  – Electric Light
  – Magneto Signal Apparatus
  – Manufacture of Carbons for Incandescent Electric Lamps
  – System of Electric Lighting
  – Treating Carbons for Electric Lamps
  – Incandescing Electric Lamp
  – Electric Lamp
  – Method of Forming Enlarged Ends on Carbon Filaments
  – System of Electric Lighting
  – Electric Lamp
  – Relay for Telegraphs
  – Testing Electric-Light Carbons
  – Electric Lamp
  – Regulating the Generation of Electric Currents
  – Electric Lamp
  – Webermeter
  – Incandescent Electric Lamp
  – Incandescent Electric Lamp
  – Magneto or Dynamo Electric Machine
  – Electric Lighting
  – Manufacturing Carbons for Electric Lamps
  – Electric Meter
  – Manufacture of Carbons for Electric Lamps
  – Manufacturing Carbons for Electric Lights
  – Electric Lamp
  – Electric Lamp
  – Fixture and Attachment for Electric Lamps
  – Current-Regulator for Dynamo-Electric Machines
  – System of Electric Lighting
  – Carbonizer
  – Fitting and Fixture for Electric Lamps
  – Apparatus for Producing High Vacuums
  – Apparatus for Treating Carbons for Electric Lamps
  – Apparatus for Treating Carbons for Electric Lamps
  – Manufacture of Incandescent Electric Lamps
  – Electric Motor
  – Electro-Magnetic Brake
  – Preserving Fruit
  – Magnetic Separator

201 to 300

The next series of patents Edison received was mainly for the electrical distribution of power and the electric light.  In 1883, Edward H. Johnson, a business associate of Edison, persuaded Frank J. Sprague to work for Edison. One of Sprague's significant contributions to the Edison Laboratory was the introduction of mathematical methods.

  – Vacuum Apparatus (1881)
  – Governor for Electric Engines
  – Utilizing Electricity as a Motive Power
  – Depositing Cell for Plating the Connections of Electric Lamps, & c.
  – Apparatus for Treating Carbons for Electric Lamps
  – Webermeter 
  – Vacuum-Pump
  – Dynamo-Electric Machine
  – Electric Light
  – Electric Lamp
  – Carbon for Electric Lamps
  – Electro-Magnetic Motor
  – System of Electric Lighting
  – Electric Lamp
  – Manufacture of Electric Lamps
  – Electric Meter
  – Electric Lamp
  – Electrical Governor
  – Incandescent Electric Lamp
  – Electric Lamp and the Manufacture Thereof
  – Magneto or Dynamo Electric Machine
  – System of Electric Lighting
  – Underground Conductors
  – Electric Chandelier
  – Electric Lamp and Socket or Holder
  – Regulator for Dynamo-Electric Machines
  – Regulator for Magneto or Dynamo Electric Machines
  – Webermeter
  – Webermeter
  – Electrical Drop-Light
  – Telephone
  – Telephone
  – Magnetic Ore-Separator
  – Electro-Magnetic Railway
  – Dynamo or Magneto Electric Machine
  – Regulator for Dynamo or Magneto Electric Machines
  – Electric Lamp
  – Regulator for Dynamo or Magneto Electric Machines
  – Electric Chandelier
  – Electric-Arc Light
  – Manufacture of Carbons for Electric Lamps
  – Dynamo-Electric Machine
  – Straightening Carbons of Electric Incandescent Lamps
  – Electrical Distribution System
  – Magneto or Dynamo Electric Machine
  – Mold for Carbonizing Incandescents
  – Process of Making Incandescents
  – Dynamo Magneto Electric Machine
  – Vacuum Apparatus
  – Dynamo or Magneto Electric Machine
  – Commutator for Dynamo or Magneto Electric Machines
  – Magneto or Dynamo Electric Machine
  – Electric Lamp
  – Electric Distribution and Translation System
  – Magneto-Electric Machine
  – System of Conductors for the Distribution of Electricity
  – Dynamo or Magneto Electric Machine
  – Dynamo or Magneto Electric Machine
  – Dynamo or Magneto Electric Machine
  – Dynamo or Magneto Electric Machine
  – Manufacture of Incandescing Electric Lamps
  – Incandescent Electric Lamp
  – Incandescent Electric Lamp
  – Incandescent Electric Lamp
  – Incandescent Electric Lamp
  – Incandescing Electric Lamp
  – Incandescent Electric Lamp
  – Incandescent Electric Lamp
  – Regulator for Dynamo-Electric Machines
  – Regulator for Dynamo-Electric Machines
  – Regulator for Dynamo-Electric Machines
  – Regulator for Dynamo-Electric Machines
  – Regulator for Dynamo-Electric Machines
  – Regulator for Dynamo-Electric Machines
  – Regulator for Dynamo-Electric Machines
  – Regulator for Dynamo-Electric Machines
  – Regulator for Dynamo-Electric Machines
  – Regulator for Dynamo-Electric Machines
  – Regulator for Dynamo-Electric Machines
  – Regulator for Dynamo-Electric Machines
  – Regulator for Dynamo-Electric Machines
  – Regulator for Dynamo-Electric Machines
  – Regulator for Dynamo-Electric Machines
  – Regulator for Dynamo-Electric Machines
  – Electric Lamp and Holder for the Same
  – Method of Maintaining Temperature in Webermeters
  – Electric-Arc Light
  – Electric-Lighting System
  – Method of Treating Carbons for Electric Lamps
  – Electro-Magnetic Railway-Engine
  – Regulator for Dynamo-Electric Machines
  – Regulator for Dynamo-Electric Machines
  – Regulator for Dynamo-Electric Machines
  – Regulator for Dynamo-Electric Machines
  – Regulator for Dynamo-Electric Machines
  – Regulator for Dynamo-Electric Machines
  – Dynamo-Electric Machine
  – Apparatus for the Electrical Transmission of Power
  – Telephone
  – Telephone

301 to 400

  – Electric Incandescent Lamp (1882)
  – Vacuum Apparatus
  – Electric Distribution System
  – Dynamo or Magneto Electric Machine
  – Incandescing Electric Lamp
  – Manufacture of Incandescing Electric Lamps
  – Shafting
  – Governor for Dynamo-Electric Machines
  – Regulator for Dynamo-Electric Machines
  – Telephone
  – Incandescing Electric Lamp
  – Incandescing Electric Lamp
  – Regulator for Dynamo-Electric Machines
  – Regulator for Dynamo-Electric Machines
  – Turn-Table for Electric Railways
  – Electro-Magnetic Railway System
  – Regulator for Driving Engines of Electrical Generators
  – Secondary Battery
  – Valve-Gear for Electrical Generator-Engines
  – Electrical Railroad
  – Magneto-Electric Signaling Apparatus
  – Art of Malleableizing Iron
  – System of Underground Conductors for Electrical Distribution
  – System of Electrical Distribution
  – Mold for Carbonizing
  – Secondary Battery
  – Electric Lamp
  – Incandescing Electric Lamp
  – Incandescent Electric Lamp
  – Manufacture of Incandescents
  – Transmitting-Telephone
  – Telephone
  – Manufacture of Incandescing Electric Lamps
  – Incandescing Electric Lamp
  – Means for Operating and Regulating Electrical Generators
  – Electrical Generator and Motor
  – Regulator for Dynamo-Electric Machines
  – Regulator for Dynamo-Electric Machines
  – Manufacture of Incandescing Electric Lamps
  – Manufacture of Incandescing Electric Lamps
  – Manufacture of Incandescing Electric Lamps
  – Apparatus for Translating Electric Currents From High to Low Tension
  – Dynamo-Electric Machine
  – System of Electrical Distribution
  – Regulator for Dynamo-Electric Machines
  – Regulator for Dynamo-Electric Machines
  – Electrical Generator
  – Webermeter
  – Dynamo or Magneto Electric Machine
  – Magneto-Electric Signaling Apparatus
  – System of Electrical Distribution
  – System of Electrical Distribution
  – System of Electrical Distribution
  – System of Electrical Distribution
  – Electric Regulator
  – Dynamo-Electric Machine
  – Dynamo-Electric Machine
  – Dynamo-Electric Machine
  – System of Electrical Distribution
  – System of Electrical Distribution
  – System of Electrical Distribution
  – Method of Manufacturing Incandescing Electric Lamps
  – Incandescing Electric Lamp
  – Incandescing Conductor for Electric Lamps
  – Dynamo or Magneto Electric Machine
  – Mold for Carbonizing
  – Dynamo or Magneto Electric Machine
  – Regulator for Dynamo-Electric Machines
  – Regulator for Systems of Electrical Distribution
  – Regulator for Dynamo or Magneto Electric Machines
  – Electrical Generator or Motor
  – Insulation of Railroad-Tracks Used for Electrical Circuits
  – Incandescent Electric Lamp
  – Electrical Meter
  – Type-Writer
  – Electric-Arc Light
  – Incandescent Electric Lamp
  – Dynamo-Electric Machine
  – Dynamo-Electric Machine
  – Dynamo-Electric Machine
  – Incandescing Conductor for Electric Lamps
  – Electrical Conductor
  – Dynamo-Electric Machine
  – Method of Treating Carbons for Electric Lights
  – Dynamo-Electric Machine
  – Dynamo-Electric Machine
  – Mode of Operating Dynamo-Electric Machines
  – Electrical Meter
  – Dynamo-Electric Machine
  – Device for Protecting Electric-Light Systems from Lightning
  – System of Electrical Distribution
  – Incandescent Electric Lamp
  – Electrical Conductor
  – Filament for Incandescent Lamps
  – Electrical Meter
  – Electrical Indicator
  – Chemical Stock Quotation Telegraph
  – Incandescent Electric Lamp
  – Incandescent Electric Lamp
  – Incandescent Electric Lamp

401 to 500
This period includes patents for electrical distribution circuits and methods as well as patents for the ore refining business Edison was embarking on. He also continued to patent improvements in telegraphy, phonography, and lighting. Arthur Edwin Kennelly contributed to a variety of Edison's endeavors undertaken to create a unique product or service from 1887 to 1893.

  – Commutator for Dynamo-Electric Machines (1885)
  – System of Electric Lighting
  – System of Electric Lighting
  – System of Electric Lighting
  – Telephone
  – Telegraphy
  – Duplex Telegraphy
  – Way-Station Quadruplex Telegraphy
  – Mold for Carbonizing
  – Telephone
  – Electric Railway
  – System of Electrical Distribution
  – Telephonic Repeater
  – Electrical Signaling Apparatus
  – Telephone-Circuit
  – Incandescent Electric Lamp
  – Incandescing Electric Lamp
  – System of Electrical Distribution
  – Electrical Signaling Apparatus
  – Electrode for Telephone-Transmitters
  – System of Railway Signaling
  – Railway-Telegraphy
  – Electric Lamp
  – Incandescent Electric Lamp
  – Incandescent Electric Lamp
  – Manufacture of Carbon Conductors
  – Incandescent Electric Lamp
  – Incandescing Electric Lamp
  – Valve-Gear
  – Filament for Incandescent Electric Lamps
  – System of Electrical Distribution
  – System of Electrical Distribution
  – System of Electrical Distribution
  – System of Electrical Distribution
  – System of Electrical Distribution
  – System of Electrical Distribution
  – Electric Meter
  – Manufacture of Filaments for Incandescing Electric Lights
  – Electrical Transmission of Power
  – Electrical Transmission of Power
  – Electrical Transmission of Power
  – Electrical Transmission of Power
  – Electrical Transmission of Power
  – Electrical Transmission of Power
  – Electrical Transmission of Power
  – Telegraphy
  – Dynamo-Electric Machine : Includes an extra coil and utilizes a field of force.
  – Telegraphy
  – Magnetic Separator
  – Telephone-Transmitter
  – Incandescent Electric Lamp
  – Regulator for Dynamo-Electric Machines
  – System of Electrical Distribution
  – Commutator for Dynamo-Electric Machines
  – Pyromagnetic Motor
  – System of Electrical Distribution
  – System of Electrical Distribution
  – Burnishing Attachment for Phonographs
  – System of Electrical Distribution
  – Feed and Return Mechanism for Phonographs
  – Process of Making Phonogram-Blanks
  – Phonogram-Blank
  – Process of Duplicating Phonograms
  – Phonogram-Blank
  – Railway Signaling
  – System of Electrical Distribution
  – Phonograph
  – Incandescing Electric Lamp
  – Process of Making Carbon Filaments
  – System of Electric Lighting
  – Incandescent Electric Lamp
  – Process of Making Phonogram-Blanks
  – Machine for Making Phonogram-Blanks
  – Machine for Making Phonogram-Blanks
  – Method of Preparing Phonograph Recording-Surfaces
  – Phonograph-Recorder
  – Method of Recording and Reproducing Sounds
  – Method of Recording and Reproducing Sounds
  – Phonograph-Recorder
  – Phonograph-Recorder
  – Phonograph-Reproducer
  – Circuit-Controller for Dynamo-Electric Machines
  – Method of Manufacturing Electric Lamps
  – Incandescent-Lamp Filament
  – Magnetic Separator
  – Phonograph Recorder and Reproducer
  – Method of Winding Field-Magnets
  – Phonograph
  – Incandescent Electric Lamp
  – Ore-Separator
  – Phonograph Recorder and Reproducer
  – Phonograph
  – Phonogram-Blank
  – Method of Making Phonogram-Blanks
  – Method of Making Phonogram-Blanks
  – System of Electric Lighting
  – Incandescing Electric Lamp
  – Electrical-Distribution System
  – Manufacture of Incandescent Electric Lamps
  – Telephone

501 to 600

This series of patents mainly focus on the phonograph, telegraphy, telephone, and electrical generation and distribution.

  – Phonograph (1889)
  – Phonogram-Blank
  – Phonograph
  – Process of Treating Phonogram-Blanks
  – Automatic Determining Device for Phonographs
  – Automatic Determining Device for Phonographs
  – Automatic Determining Device for Phonographs
  – Automatic Determining Device for Phonographs
  – Phonogram-Blank
  – Electric Meter
  – Electric Meter
  – Manufacture of Carbon Filaments
  – Carbonizing-Flask
  – Manufacture of Incandescent Electric Lamps
  – Manufacture of Incandescent Electric Lamps
  – Manufacture of Carbon Filaments
  – Phonogram-Blank
  – Phonograph
  – Phonogram-Blank
  – Quadruplex Telegraph
  – Telegraphy
  – Telegraphy
  – Telegraphy
  – Apparatus for Speaking-Telephones
  – Telephonic Repeater
  – Telephonic Repeater
  – Phonograph for Dolls or other Toys
  – Measurement of Electricity in Distribution Systems
  – Incandescent Lamp
  – Cut-Out for Incandescent Electric Lamps
  – Commutator for Dynamo-Electric Machines
  – Automatic Determining Device for Phonographs
  – Phonogram-Blank
  – Magnetic Separator
  – Phonograph
  – Automatic Determining Device for Phonographs
  – Phonograph
  – Voltaic Battery
  – Magnetic Separator
  – Phonogram-Blank
  – Manufacture of Incandescent Lamps
  – Filament for Incandescent Lamps
  – Electric-Lighting System
  – Dynamo or Magneto-Electric Machine
  – Telegraph-Relay
  – Electric Generator
  – Thermo-Electric Battery
  – Magnetic Ore-Separator
  – Propelling Mechanism for Electric Vehicles
  – Means for Charging and Using Secondary Batteries
  – Process of and Apparatus for Generating Electricity
  – Telegraphy
  – Method of Making Armatures for Dynamo-Electric Machines
  – Electric Motor
  – Method of and Apparatus for Drawing Wire
  – Method of and Apparatus for Drawing Wire
  – Apparatus for Transmitting Power
  – Telegraphy
  – Phonograph
  – Phonograph
  – Phonograph-Recorder
  – Phonograph
  – Method of Making Phonogram-Blanks
  – Propelling Device for Electric Cars
  – Phonogram-Blank
  – Manufacture of Incandescent Electric Lamps
  – Manufacture of Carbon Filaments
  – Gage for Testing Fibers for Incandescent-Lamp Carbons
  – System of Electric Lighting
  – Commutator for Dynamo-Electric Machines
  – Arc Lamp
  – Electric Signaling Apparatus
  – Fuse-Block
  – Telephone
  – Manufacture of Incandescent Electric Lamps
  – System of Electrical Distribution
  – Method of Insulating Electrical Conductors
  – Lamp-Base
  – Electric-Lighting System
  – System of Electric Lighting
  – Junction-Box for Electric Wires
  – Electric-Lighting System
  – Carbonizing-Chamber
  – Phonograph
  – Leading-In Wire for Incandescent Lamps
  – System of Electric Lighting
  – Locomotive for Electric Railways
  – Electric-Arc Light
  – Manufacture of Filaments for Incandescent Electric Lamps
  – Electric Railway
  – Telegraph
  – Device for Turning Off Phonogram-Blanks
  – Turning-Off Device for Phonographs
  – Phonograph-Recorder
  – Sextuplex Telegraph
  – Sextuplex Telegraph
  – Phonograph
  – Incandescent-Lamp Filament
  – Incandescent Electric Lamp
  – Phonograph Recorder or Reproducer

601 to 700

This series of patents contain patents for the phonograph, lamps, telephone, dynamo systems, motors, and locomotives.

  – Phonograph (1891)
  – Phonograph-Doll
  – Phonograph
  – Magnetic Belting
  – Smoothing-Tool for Phonogram-Blanks
  – Manufacture of Incandescent Electric Lamps
  – Process of and Apparatus for Generating Electricity
  – Phonogram-Blank Carrier
  – Incandescent Electric Lamp
  – System of Distributing Electricity
  – Process of Extracting Copper Pyrites
  – Method of Bricking Fine Ores
  – Armature Connection for Motors or Generators
  – Means for Transmitting Signals Electrically 
  – Phonograph
  – Armature for Dynamos or Motors
  – Cut-Out for Incandescent Lamps
  – Art of Electrolytic Decomposition
  – Converter System for Electric Railways
  – Commutator-Brush for Electric Motors and Dynamos
  – Manufacture of Filaments for Incandescent Lamps
  – Railway-Signaling
  – Electric Conductor
  – Manufacture of Filaments for Incandescent Lamps
  – Dynamo-Electric Machine or Motor
  – Driving Mechanism for Cars
  – Alternating-Current Generator
  – Magnetic Separator
  – Dynamo-Electric Machine
  – Ore-Conveyor and Method of Arranging Ore Thereon
  – Dust-Proof Bearing for Shafts
  – Dust-Proof Journal-Bearing
  – Ore-Screening Apparatus
  – Speaking-Telegraph
  – Speaking-Telegraph
  – Speaking-Telegraph
  – Process of Extracting Gold from Sulphide Ores
  – Ore-Conveying Apparatus
  – Dust-Proof Swivel Shaft-Bearing
  – Electric Locomotive
  – Electric Locomotive
  – Electric Locomotive
  – Electric Railway
  – System of Electric Lighting
  – Incandescent Electric Lamp
  – System of Electrical Distribution
  – Incandescent Electric Lamp
  – Electric-Lighting System
  – Ore-Screening Apparatus
  – Pyromagnetic Generator
  – Expansible Pulley
  – Trolley for Electric Railways
  – Means for Propelling Electric Cars
  – Electric Locomotive
  – Lightning-Arrester
  – Conductor for Electric Railways
  – Electric Meter
  – Method of and Apparatus for Separating Ores
  – Incandescent Electric Lamp
  – Electric-Arc Lamp
  – Telephone-Repeater
  – Fac-simile Telegraph
  – Duplex Telegraph
  – Means for Controlling Electric Generation
  – Electrical Depositing-Meter
  – Manufacture of Carbon Filaments
  – Manufacture of Carbon Filaments
  – Duplicating Phonograms
  – Phonograph Cutting-Tool
  – Phonograph-Reproducer
  – Phonograph
  – Manufacture of Carbon Filaments
  – Manufacture of Carbon Filaments
  – Incandescent-Lamp Filament
  – Method of Bricking Fine Iron Ores
  – Method of Magnetically Separating Ores
  – Method of Magnetic-Ore Separation
  – System of Railway Signaling
  – Phonograph
  – Phonograph-Reproducer
  – Phonogram-Blank
  – Art of Generating Electricity
  – Manufacture of Carbon Filaments for Electric Lamps
  – Cut-Out for Incandescent Electric Lamps
  – Stop Device
  – Process of Coating Conductors for Incandescent Lamps
  – Speaking-Telegraph
  – Electric Locomotive
  – Apparatus for Exhibiting Photographs of Moving Objects
  – Transmission of Power
  – Phonograph
  – Roller for Crushing Ore or Other Material
  – Phonograph
  – Phonograph
  – Phonograph
  – Phonograph
  – Method of Making Plate Glass
  – Apparatus for Making Glass
  – Composition Brick and Method of Making Same
  – System of Electrical Distribution

701 to 800

Around these patents issuances, Thomas Armat joined Edison and sold him the patents to the machine known as the Vitascope.

  – Electric Railway (1893)
  – Sextuplex Telegraph
  – Method of and Apparatus for Mixing Materials
  – Phonograph
  – Phonograph
  – Regulator for Dynamo-Electric Machines
  – System of Electrical Distribution
  – Manufacture of Carbon Filaments
  – Manufacture of Carbons for Electric Lamps
  – Art of Plating One Material with Another
  – Filament for Incandescent Lamps
  – Manufacture of Carbon Filaments
  – Induction-Converter
  – Incandescent Electric Lamp
  – Phonograph
  – Phonograph
  – Incandescent Conductor for Electric Lamps
  – Process of Treating and Products Derived from Vegetable Fibers
  – Filament for Incandescent Lamps
  – System of Electrical Distribution
  – Method of and Apparatus for Drawing Wire
  – Process of Separating Ores
  – Crushing-Roll
  – Phonograph
  – Kinetographic Camera 
  – Conveyor
  – Governor for Motors
  – Drying Apparatus
  – Phonograph
  – Mixer
  – Phonograph
  – Phonograph
  – Phonograph
  – Phonograph
  – Filament for Incandescent Lamps and Process of Manufacturing Same
  – Rolls
  – Expanding Pulley
  – Method of Reheating Compressed Air for Industrial Purposes
  – Drier
  – Process of Screening or Sizing Very Fine Materials
  – Apparatus for Duplicating Phonograph-Records
  – Phonograph
  – Phonographic Reproducing Device
  – Process of Making Metallic Duplicate Phonograph-Records
  – Apparatus for Reheating Compressed Air for Industrial Purposes
  – Electric Meter
  – Electric Meter
  – Apparatus for Sampling, Averaging, Mixing, and Storing Materials in Bulk
  – Machine for Forming Pulverized Material into Briquets
  – Process of Sampling, Averaging, Mixing, and Storing Materials in Bulk
  – Electric Meter
  – Flight Conveyor
  – Apparatus for Duplicating Phonograph-Records
  – Process of Duplicating Phonograph-Records
  – Lubricating Journal-Bearings
  – Conveyor
  – Apparatus for Screening or Rescreening Fine Materials
  – Method of Screening or Rescreening Fine Materials
  – Method of Breaking Rock
  – Apparatus for Breaking Rock
  – Grinding or Crushing Rolls
  – Magnetic Separator
  – Apparatus for Screening Pulverized Material
  – Phonographic Recording Apparatus
  – Magnetic Separator
  – Magnetic Separating Apparatus
  – Magnetic Separating Apparatus
  – Reversible Galvanic Battery
  – Apparatus for Screening or Sizing Very Fine Materials
  – Process of Making Duplicate Phonograph-Records
  – Reversible Galvanic Battery
  – Reversible Galvanic Battery
  – Apparatus for Reheating Compressed Air for Industrial Purposes
  – Phonograph Recording Apparatus
  – Reversible Galvanic Battery
  – Reversible Galvanic Battery
  – Reversible Galvanic Battery
  – Reversible Galvanic Battery
  – Electric Meter
  – Apparatus for Bricking Pulverized Material
  – Reproducer for Phonographs
  – Apparatus for Concentrating Magnetic Iron Ores
  – Reversible Galvanic Battery
  – Reversible Galvanic Battery
  – Electrode for Batteries
  – Reversible Galvanic Battery
  – Reproducer for Sound-Records
  – Process of Duplicating Phonograms
  – Process of Coating Phonograph-Records
  – Reversible Galvanic Battery
  – Funnel for Filling Storage-Battery Cans or Analogous Purposes
  – Means for Handling Cable-Drawn Cars on Inclines
  – Electrode for Storage Batteries
  – Reversible Galvanic Battery
  – Means for Operating Motors in Dust-Laden Atmospheres
  – Grinding-Rolls
  – Reversible Galvanic Battery
  – Process of Manufacturing Electrolytically-Active Finely-Divided Iron
  – Process of Nickel-Plating
  – Electrical Automobile

801 to 900 

Toward the end of this series of patents, Ott was the  superintendent of experimenters for Edison.

  – Compressing-Dies (1904)
  – Process of Separating Ores from Magnetic Gangue
  – Storage-Battery Tray
  – Reversible Galvanic Battery
  – Stock-House Conveyor
  – Method of Burning Portland-Cement Clinker, &c.
  – Apparatus for Burning Portland-Cement Clinker &c.
  – Magnetic Separating Apparatus
  – Method of Separating Mechanically-Entrained Globules from Gases
  – Primary Battery
  – Apparatus for Vacuously Depositing Metals
  – Method of Rendering Storage-Battery Gases Non-Explosive
  – Photographic Film for Moving-Picture Machines
  – Vehicle-Wheel
  – Rotary Cement-Kiln
  – Dry Separator
  – Gas-Separator for Storage Batteries
  – Process of Duplicating Phonographic Records
  – Lamp-Guard
  – Sheet Metal for Perforated Pockets of Storage Batteries
  – Phonograph-Record and Method of Making the Same
  – Apparatus for Burning Portland-Cement Clinker
  – Apparatus for Perforating Sheet Metal
  – Cement-Kiln
  – Pocket-Filling Machine
  – Process of Treating Alkaline
  – Storage Battery
  – Process of Cleaning Metallic Surfaces
  – Storage-Battery-Filling Apparatus
  – Gas-Separator for Storage Batteries
  – Process of Treating Alkaline Storage Batteries
  – Process of Making Metallic Films or Flakes
  – Process of Making Metallic Flakes or Scales
  – Process for Making Conducting-Films
  – Calcining-Furnace
  – Alkaline Battery
  – Process of Making Composite Metals
  – Storage-Battery Electrode-Plate
  – Sound-Recording Apparatus
  – Automatic Weighing and Mixing Apparatus
  – Method of Coating Active Material with Flake-Like Conducting Material
  – Phonograph Record or Blank
  – Apparatus for Grinding and Separating Fine Materials
  – Electrical Welding Apparatus
  – Composite Metal
  – Process of Making Articles by Electroplating
  – Secondary Battery
  – Secondary Battery
  – Process of Making Storage-Battery Electrodes
  – Diaphragm for Talking-Machines
  – Can or Receptacle for Storage Batteries
  – Storage-Battery Electrode
  – Primary and Secondary Battery
  – Storage-Battery Electrode
  – Portland Cement and Process of Manufacturing the Same
  – Can or Receptacle for Storage Batteries
  – Discharging Apparatus for Belt Conveyors
  – Process of Making Seamless Tubular Pockets or Receptacles for Storage Battery Electrodes
  – Fluorescent Electric Lamp
  – Process of Making Nickel Films
  – Process of Making Metallic Films or Flakes
  – Apparatus for Producing Perforated Strips
  – Reversible Galvanic Battery
  – Feed-Regulator for Grinding-Machines
  – Reversible Galvanic Battery
  – Electrolyte for Alkaline Storage Batteries
  – Alkaline Storage Battery
  – Apparatus for Producing Very Thin Sheet Metal
  – Process of Producing Very Thin Sheet Metal
  – Electrode Element for Storage Batteries
  – Method of Making Storage-Battery Electrodes
  – Storage-Battery Electrode
  – Apparatus for Grinding Coal
  – Metallic Film for Use with Storage-Battery Electrodes and Process of Preparing the Same
  – Storage Battery
  – Process of Making Articles by Electroplating
  – Filling Apparatus for Storage-Battery Jars & c.
  – Waterproofing-Paint for Portland-Cement Buildings
  – Waterproofing Fibers and Fabrics
  – Waterproofing-Paint for Portland-Cement Structures
  – Telegraphy
  – Storage Battery
  – Process of Making Storage-Battery Electrodes
  – Process for Making Thin Metallic Flakes
  – Shaft-Coupling
  – Apparatus for Burning Portland Cement
  – Gas-Purifier
  – Apparatus for Burning Portland Cement
  – Apparatus for Burning Portland Cement
  – Feed Mechanism for Phonographs and Other Machines
  – Tube-Filling and Tamping Machine
  – Process of Making Metallic Films or Flakes
  – Cement-Kiln
  – Phonographic Recording and Reproducing Machine
  – Electrode Element for Storage Batteries
  – Process and Apparatus for Artificially Aging or Seasoning Portland Cement
  – Horn for Talking-Machines
  – Sound-Recording Apparatus
  – Process and Apparatus for Artificially Aging or Seasoning Portland Cement
  – Storage Battery

901 to 1000

  – Automobile (1910)
  – Method of Treating Cans of Alkaline Storage Batteries
  – Storage-Battery Electrode
  – Phonographic Recording Apparatus
  – Apparatus for Making Metallic Films or Flakes
  – Sprocket-Chain Drive
  – Tube-Sealing Machine
  – Apparatus for Recording Sounds
  – Crushing-Roll
  – Crushing-Rolls
  – Apparatus for Recording or Reproducing Sounds
  – Process of Electroplating
  – Device for Viewing Moving Pictures
  – Sound-Record
  – Tube-Forming Machine
  – Method and Apparatus for Making Sound-Records
  – Flying-Machine
  – Process of Duplicating Talking-Machine Records
  – Phonograph-Reproducer
  – Storage-Battery Electrode
  – Storage Battery
  – Bucket Conveyor
  – Device for Feeding Pulverulent Material
  – Rotary Kiln
  – Phonograph-Reproducer
  – Storage Battery and Process of Treating the Same
  – Crushing and Separating Fine Materials
  – Composition for Sound-Records and Other Objects
  – Recording-Telephone
  – Storage Battery
  – Bearing
  – Giant Rolls
  – Means and Method for Preventing Depletion of Electrolyte
  – Electroplating Apparatus
  – Phonograph-Reproducer
  – Sound-Recording Apparatus
  – Phonograph-Reproducer
  – Phonographic Recording-Stylus
  – Storage Battery
  – Battery-Cell Container
  – Phonographic Apparatus
  – Storage Battery
  – Conveyor
  – Phonograph-Stylus
  – Phonograph-Reproducer
  – Phonograph Determining Device
  – Phonograph
  – Apparatus for Producing Rubber Strips
  – Art of Separating Copper from Other Metals
  – Art of Separating Copper from Other Metals
  – Phonograph-Reproducer
  – Dumping Mechanism
  – The Reproducer
  – Means for Reproducing Sound
  – Manufacture of Portland Cement
  – Cement-Burning Kiln
  – Storage Battery
  – Phonographic Recording or Reproducing Apparatus
  – Process of Making Phonograph-Records
  – Sound-Box
  – Production of Perforated Strips
  – Insulating Compound
  – Art of Forming Chemical Compounds
  – Storage Battery
  – Rectifier
  – Phonograph-Reproducer
  – Phonograph-Reproducer
  – Phonograph-Reproducer
  – Method of Making Sound-Record Molds
  – Fuel-Feeding Apparatus
  – Sound-Modifier
  – Process of Forming Phonograph-Styli
  – Phonograph-Record
  – Electrode Element
  – Method of Making Molds for Sound-Records
  – Sound-Reproducer
  – Sound-Record
  – Mold for Concrete Construction
  – Sound-Recording Apparatus
  – Machine for Shaving Sound Records or Blanks
  – Method of Presenting the Illusion of Scenes in Colors
  – Sound-Recording Apparatus
  – Charging Storage Batteries
  – Method of Producing Tablets for Sound-Records
  – Method of Making Phonograph-Records
  – Means for Utilizing the Waste Heat in Kilns
  – Method of Burning Portland-Cement Clinker
  – Phonographic Recording Apparatus
  – Alternating-Current-Rectifying System
  – Contact for Electrical Apparatus
  – Phonograph-Record
  – Phonograph-Record
  – Phonograph or Talking-Machine
  – Filament for Incandescent Electric Lamps
  – Production of Nickel Hydroxid
  – Storage Battery
  – Method of Utilizing Waste Heat in Kilns
  – Means for Concentrating Ores
  – Moving-Picture Apparatus
  – Receptacle-Filling Machine

1001 to 1084

This series of patents focus mainly on the phonograph and other talking-machines. There are several battery patents included in this portion of legal protections.

  – Apparatus for Recording and Reproducing Motion and Sounds (1916)
  – Phonograph or Talking-Machine
  – Phonograph or Talking-Machine
  – Phonograph or Talking-Machine
  – Means for Recording Sounds
  – Electrical System for Automobiles
  – Coating Apparatus
  – Production of Electrode Elements
  – Coating Apparatus
  – Sound-Modifying Device
  – Sound-Box
  – Primary Battery
  – Sound-Record Tablet
  – Process of Constructing Concrete Buildings
  – Alternating-Current Rectifier
  – Celluloid Record-Blank
  – Mold or Transfer Plate
  – Celluloid Record-Blank
  – Starting and Current-Supplying System for Automobiles 
  – Process of Making Screens for Projection
  – Electric Safety-Lantern
  – Storage Battery
  – Production of Finely-Divided Metals
  – Para-phenylene-di-amin Substance and Process Relating Thereto
  – Means for Recording Sounds
  – Friction Speed-Governor
  – Swaging-Machine
  – Projectile
  – Storage Battery
  – Projectile
  – Projectile
  – Tube Filling and Tamping Machine
  – Method and Means for Improving the Rendition of Musical Compositions
  – Mold for Sound-Records
  – Apparatus for the Production of Concrete Structures
  – Composition of Matter for Sound-Records or the Like and Process of Making the Same
  – Electroplating
  – Battery-Tray
  – Protecting-Varnish for Electrodes of Electrolytic Cells
  – Cleaning of Metallic Surfaces
  – Process of Molding
  – Nickel-Plating
  – Production of Molded Articles
  – Production of Molded Articles
  – Storage Battery
  – Storage Battery
  – Production of Thin Metallic Sheets or Foils
  – Electrode Element for Galvanic Batteries and Method of Producing ame
  – Storage-Battery Electrode and the Production of Same : Gives an increase discharge rate via lowering internal resistance
  – Protective Coating for Steel and Iron
  – Production of Molded Articles
  – Mold
  – Production of Thin Metal Sheets or Foils
  – Transmitter
  – Production of Thin Metal Sheets or Foils
  – Stylus Mounting
  – Stylus Mounting
  – Regeneration of Alkaline Storage-Battery Elements
  – Regeneration of Storage-Battery Elements
  – Voltaic Battery and the Production of Electrode Elements Therefor
  – Sound Record
  – Method of Producing Chlorinated Rubber
  – Storage Battery
  – Production of Disk Phonograph Records
  – Storage Battery
  – Centrifugal Speed Governor
  – Production of Depolarizing Agent for Voltaic Battery
  – Mounting for Diamonds and the Like
  – Cabinet
  – Storage-Battery Electrode Element and Production Thereof
  – Storage Battery
  – Production of Alkali-Metal Compounds from Silicates Containing Them
  – Method of Producing Sound-Record Tablets
  – Receiving Apparatus for Radio and Telephone Circuits
  – Phonograph
  – Phonograph Reproducer
  – Apparatus for Producing Storage-Battery Electrode Elements
  – Extraction of Rubber from Plants
  – Mounting for Diaphragms of Sound Boxes
  – Production of Molded Articles
  – Dynamo-Electric Machine
  – Electroplating Apparatus
  – Production of Molded Articles
  – Holder for Article to be Electroplated

Design patents

Edison obtained a few design patents for the unique appearance and concept of items, giving Edison an industrial design right. His design patents are for phonograph cabinets and light bulbs with substantial decorative features.

  – Design for an Incandescent Electric Lamp
  – Design for Incandescing Electric Lamp
  – Design for a Phonograph-Cabinet
  – Design for a Cabinet
  – Design for a Grille for Phonograph Cabinets
  – Design for a Grille for Phonograph Cabinets
  – Design for a Phonograph Cabinet
  – Design for a Phonograph Cabinet
  – Design for a Phonograph Cabinet

Improvements
 Lewis Latimer patented an improved method of producing the filament in light bulbs (there is no evidence that this was ever used by an Edison company)
 Emile Berliner developed the gramophone, which is essentially an improved phonograph, with the main difference being the use of flat records with spiral grooves.
 Edward H. Johnson had light bulbs specially made, hand-wired, and displayed at his home on Fifth Avenue in New York City on the first electrically-illuminated Christmas tree on December 22, 1882.

See also

 Phonograph
 Incandescent light bulb
 Electric locomotive
 Kinetoscope
 Fluorescent lamp
 Nickel-iron battery

Related links and patent resources
 Thomas Edison's Patents – Rutgers University
 Dyer, Frank Lewis, "Edison, His Life And Inventions". (Worldwideschool.org)

References

Edison
Patents